"Unbelievable" is a song by British singer Craig David. It was written by David, Mark Taylor, and Paul Barry for his third studio album The Story Goes... (2005). The third single from the album, it was rumoured to be a double A-side of fan-favourites, "Hypnotic" and "Johnny", however it was "Unbelievable" that was chosen. It became one of David's smallest hits to date, peaking at number 18 in the UK. The disappointing performance of the song in the UK, where the first two singles charted in the top five, led "Unbelievable" to be the final single from The Story Goes.... The song was slightly remixed for the single release.

Chart performance
"Unbelievable" charted at number eighteen on the UK Singles Chart, spending five weeks within the UK top 75. It remains his second-lowest charting peak, with only "You Don't Miss Your Water ('Til the Well Runs Dry)" charting lower. David's collaboration with Kano also charted at eighteen but had a longer chart run. It did not chart elsewhere.

Music video
The music video was directed by Robert Hales.

Track listing

Notes
  signifies an additional producer

Charts

Release history

References

2005 songs
2006 singles
Craig David songs
Music videos directed by Robert Hales
Songs written by Craig David
Songs written by Mark Taylor (record producer)
Songs written by Paul Barry (songwriter)
Warner Records singles